Roșcani is a commune in Iași County, Western Moldavia, Romania. It is composed of two villages, Rădeni and Roșcani.

References

Communes in Iași County
Localities in Western Moldavia